The 2000–01 season of the Norwegian Premier League, the highest bandy league for men in Norway.

8 games were played in an initial round, with a further 10 games for the top six teams. 2 points were given for wins and 1 for draws. Stabæk won the league, whereas no team was relegated.

League table

First round

The top six teams progressed to the finals. Stabæk carried three bonus points into the finals, whereas Røa carried two and Mjøndalen one bonus point. The bottom three continued to a relegation playoff, which all three teams survived.

Finals

References

Seasons in Norwegian bandy
2000 in bandy
2001 in bandy
Band
Band